Prokineticin receptor 2 (PKR2), is a dimeric G protein-coupled receptor encoded by the PROKR2 gene in humans.

Function 

Prokineticins are secreted proteins that can promote angiogenesis and induce strong gastrointestinal smooth muscle contraction. The protein encoded by this gene is an integral membrane protein and G protein-coupled receptor for prokineticins. PKR2 is composed of 384 amino acids. Asparagine residues at position 7 and 27 undergo N-linked glycosylation. Cysteine residues at position 128 and 208 form a disulfide bond. The encoded protein is similar in sequence to GPR73, another G protein-coupled receptor for prokineticins. PKR2 is also linked to mammalian circadian rhythm. Levels of  PKR2 mRNA fluctuate in the suprachiasmatic nucleus, increasing during the day and decreasing at night. 

Mutations in the PROKR2 (also known as KAL3) gene have been implicated in hypogonadotropic hypogonadism and gynecomastia. Total loss of PKR2 in mice leads to spontaneous torpor usually beginning at dusk and lasting for 8 hours on average.

PKR2 functions as a G protein-coupled receptor, thus it has a signaling cascade when it's ligand binds. PKR2 is a Gq-coupled protein, so when the ligand binds, beta-type phospholipase C is activated which creates inositol triphosphate. This then triggers calcium release inside the cell.

See also 
 Prokineticin receptor
 Kallmann syndrome

References

Further reading

External links 
  GeneReviews/NCBI/NIH/UW entry on Kallmann syndrome
 

G protein-coupled receptors